Lincolnton may refer to:
 Lincolnton, North Carolina
 Lincolnton, Georgia